Khalid Irfan is an American-Pakistani comic poet.

Early life and career

Irfan was born in Karachi, Pakistan. His father Irshad Ali migrated to Pakistan from Badayun, India in 1947.
He received a master's degree in Urdu literature. He has two sons, Muhammad Waleed Faran and Hamza Shayan.

Irfan has published five poetry collections. In several poems he has described social and political issues of his native country Pakistan and his adopted country the United States. He is in charge of the literary section of Urdu Times Weekly.

See also
 List of Pakistani poets
 List of Urdu language poets

References

External links
 Khalid Irfan: Humorous Urdu Poet from New York

Living people
Pakistani poets
Urdu-language poets from Pakistan
Pakistani humorists
Writers from Karachi
Pakistani emigrants to the United States
Muhajir people
1977 births